Mauricio Hernández Sánchez (born 30 November 1961) is a Mexican middle-distance runner. He competed in the men's 800 metres at the 1988 Summer Olympics.

References

1961 births
Living people
Athletes (track and field) at the 1987 Pan American Games
Athletes (track and field) at the 1988 Summer Olympics
Mexican male middle-distance runners
Olympic athletes of Mexico
Place of birth missing (living people)
Central American and Caribbean Games medalists in athletics
Pan American Games competitors for Mexico
20th-century Mexican people
21st-century Mexican people